Fabricio Bautista Fontanini (born 30 March 1990) is an Argentine footballer. He plays as a right-footed centre-back for Atlético de Rafaela.

On 11 July 2013, he swapped his old club Atlético de Rafaela for San Lorenzo.

On 28 July 2016 Fontanini was signed by Italian Serie B club Vicenza Calcio. On 17 November he was released.

Honours
San Lorenzo
Argentine Primera División: 2013 Inicial
Copa Libertadores: 2014

References

External links
 

1990 births
Living people
Argentine footballers
Argentine expatriate footballers
Argentine people of Italian descent
Italian sportspeople of Argentine descent
Atlético de Rafaela footballers
Quilmes Atlético Club footballers
San Lorenzo de Almagro footballers
L.R. Vicenza players
O'Higgins F.C. footballers
[[Category:Newell's Old Boys] footballers]]
Ñublense footballers
S.D. Aucas footballers
Serie B players
Chilean Primera División players
Argentine Primera División players
Ecuadorian Serie A players
Argentine expatriate sportspeople in Chile
Argentine expatriate sportspeople in Italy
Argentine expatriate sportspeople in Ecuador
Expatriate footballers in Chile
Expatriate footballers in Italy
Expatriate footballers in Ecuador
People from Rafaela
Sportspeople from Santa Fe Province